is a Japanese football player. He currently plays for Gainare Tottori in J3 League. He has previously had loan spells with the J.League U-22 Selection and J2 League outfit Zweigen Kanazawa. His playing position is goalkeeper and he has spent most of his career as a backup 'keeper.

Club career

Born in Minoh in the north of Osaka, Tajiri came up through Gamba Osaka's youth system and earned his first professional contract ahead of the 2012 season.   He spent his first 5 years with the club as a reserve and didn't see a single minute of game time.   

He finally got the chance to get on the field in 2017.   After starting the season as third-choice goalkeeper, an injury to first-choice Masaaki Higashiguchi  saw Tajiri make the bench for the clash at home to Urawa Red Diamonds on 19 March 2017.   Starting goalkeeper Yōsuke Fujigaya got injured in the 73rd minute and Tajiri was brought on as a replacement with Gamba leading 1-0 courtesy of Yasuyuki Konno's goal earlier in the second half.   Unfortunately he was unable to keep a clean sheet and Rafael Silva equalised for Urawa in the 92nd minute.

That was to be his only appearance for Gamba in 2017 and he was then loaned out to J2 side Zweigen Kanazawa for the next 18 months where he was only able to play 9 league games before moving back to Osaka for the 2019 season.

Tajiri played 9 games across the 2014 and 2015 seasons for the J.League U-22 Selection, a team set up to increase the number of competitors in J3 League and also give a platform for young Japanese players to perform ahead of the 2016 Olympic games.   The following year he played 13 times for Gamba Osaka's newly formed Under-23 side in J3 League.

Club statistics

Last update: 2 December 2018

Reserves performance

References

External links

1993 births
Living people
Association football people from Osaka Prefecture
People from Minoh, Osaka
Japanese footballers
J1 League players
J2 League players
J3 League players
Gamba Osaka players
Gamba Osaka U-23 players
Zweigen Kanazawa players
J.League U-22 Selection players
Gainare Tottori players
Iwate Grulla Morioka players
Association football goalkeepers